Colac  is a small city in the Western District of Victoria, Australia, approximately 150 kilometres south-west of Melbourne on the southern shore of Lake Colac.

History
For thousands of years clans of the Gulidjan people occupied the region of Colac.

British colonisation
The British first entered the region in March 1837, when several land-holders came upon Lake Colac while searching for the missing colonist Joseph Gellibrand. Another larger search party, which was acting on information that local Gulidjan had killed Gellibrand, arrived in April. This group returned to Geelong after two Gulidjan people were killed by Aboriginal trackers accompanying the party.

Colonisation of the area began in September 1837 with the arrival of grazier Hugh Murray (died 1869) who selected 34,000 acres of land and established three sheep stations: Warrion, Elliminyt and Barongarook. According to Murray, conflict with the resident Gulidjan was limited, with one Aboriginal man being shot dead during punitive raids upon Aboriginal settlements following the taking of sheep. In 1841, around forty Gulidjan lived and worked on what was now Murray's property. 

The surveying for a village began in 1841 and the township of Lake Colac was proclaimed in 1848.

The Post Office opened on 1 July 1848 as Lake Colac and was renamed Colac in 1854.
Colac Botanic Gardens in Queen Street located on the shores of Lake Colac, were established in 1868.

Brookhouse Mystery
In 1854 town founder Hugh Murray employed a couple of shepherds named Thomas Brookhouse and Patrick Geary. Brookhouse who was looking for missing sheep disappeared without a trace. Patrick Geary and his wife soon left the district. Fifteen years later a boy out rabbiting found the skeletal remains of Thomas Brookhouse under a pile of rocks near Lake Corangamite. Brookhouse had his head smashed in. It took Police two years to track Patrick Geary and charge him with Brookhouse's murder. A friend of Geary told the court that Geary had killed Brookhouse with an axe to stop him from informing Murray of Geary's sheep stealing activities. Geary was hanged in Melbourne in 1871.

Role in World War I
A plaque on the southern side of the Memorial Square commemorates two historic speeches given on consecutive nights in Colac, beginning on 31 July 1914 with the then Federal opposition leader, Andrew Fisher, and followed the next night by the Prime Minister Joseph Cook. The two speeches declared Australia's commitment to follow Britain into World War I, with Fisher declaring "Should honor demand the mother country taking part in hostilities, Australians would stand beside her to the last man and shilling." and Cook's famous reiteration that "If the old country is at war, so are we." Fisher became Prime Minister for the third time on 5 September.

The War Memorial stands in the centre of Memorial Square.

Heritage listed sites

Colac contains a number of heritage listed sites, including:

 1 Murray Street, Adam Rea's Store 
 1–5 Fyans Street, Colac Botanic Gardens

Schools

 Trinity College, Colac
 Colac Secondary College
 Sacred Heart Primary School, Colac
 Colac West Primary School
 Colac Primary School
 Colac South West Primary School 
 St Mary's Primary School
 Colac Specialist School
 Elliminyt Primary School

Natural features
The plains around Colac are the third largest volcanic plain in the world. Australia's largest permanent salt lake and Victoria's largest natural lake, Lake Corangamite, is nearby and Red Rock Reserve is nearby too.

Lake Colac's water level can drop over summer dry periods to the point that it actually dried up for the first time in recorded history in 2009, but is always replenished after drought and is used for fishing, boating and water skiing.

Transport
 The Princes Highway (part of Australia's circumnavigational Highway 1) runs through the city and forms its main street, Murray Street.  The highway runs west toward Camperdown and east to Geelong and beyond to Melbourne.  Several secondary sealed roads including the C161, C155 and C154 run south toward Apollo Bay and the coastal tourism areas of the Otway Ranges Great Ocean Road, The Twelve Apostles and the Shipwreck Coast.  The Colac-Ballarat Road runs north connecting Colac to Ballarat via Cressy.

The railway through the town was opened in 1877, and extended from 1883 as part of the line to the south west of the state.

The Irrewarra-Cressy line towards Ballarat also ran from Colac between 1889 and 1953 
and the Alvie line opened in 1923 and closed in 1954.

A narrow gauge branch line also originated from the town, the branch line to Beech Forest opened in 1902 and was extended to Crowes in 1911, finally closing in 1962. The route of the abandoned railway has been developed as the Old Beechy Rail Trail.

The local railway station is served by V/Line passenger services on the Warrnambool line. The train stops at Camperdown and Terang.

Events
Colac was the home of the annual "Cliff Young Australian 6-day race". The event, which was originally orchestrated by Stuart Walker, occurred for over 20 years until 2006 and is a running/walking event. It was held on the Memorial Square which is right in the heart of Colac and attracted entries from all over the world.

Also held at the Memorial Square is the annual Colac KANA festival taking place on the third Saturday of March. Many market stalls, children's entertainment and a song and dance stage can be found at the festival. The most popular feature of the festival is its parade through the streets of Colac's CBD. The parade showcases local primary schools and their students as well as local clubs, emergency service organisations and businesses.

On the last week-end of October, first weekend in November the Colac Otway Arts Trail takes place. Featuring artists, studios and galleries in the Colac Otway Shire the trail also feature the 'Art Walk on Murray' where local artists display their work in the windows of the shops along the Murray Street precinct.

Industry
With a wealth of natural resources, such as agriculture and timber, Colac has a strong manufacturing background, with major local employers including Bulla Dairy Foods and AKD Softwoods.

While historically the region supported numerous successful brickworks, nowadays the major primary industries are agriculture, such as the dairying, beef, lamb and finewool merino industries.

Sister city
Colac is the sister city of Walker, Michigan, USA.

Climate
Colac has an oceanic climate (Cfb) with warm summers and cool damp winters. It records only 55.3 clear days on average.

Media

Colac has its own newspaper, The Colac Herald, published on Mondays, Wednesdays and Fridays. Colac is serviced by a number of local radio stations: 3CS 1134AM, MIXX FM 106.3 MHz, and OCR FM Community Radio Station 98.3 MHz and 88.7 MHz in Apollo Bay and surrounds.

Most digital terrestrial television services are received via UHF from Ballarat Lookout Hill. In addition to the Ballarat service, a local repeater on nearby Warrion Hill provides an alternative source of television reception. As of August 2022, Television channels available include Southern Cross 10, 10HD, 10 Bold, 10 Peach, 10 Shake and Sky News Regional. These stations are now broadcast by Southern Cross Austereo after affiliate changes occurred in July 2021. This change included 9Gem, 9Go! and 9Life which are owned by Nine Network except TVSN which is owned by Network 10 but is now broadcast by WIN Television who also transmit WIN HD channel 9HD and GOLD. The city also receives Prime7 (now Seven Regional), 7TWO, 7mate, ishop tv, Racing.com and 7flix (sub-licensees of the Seven Network) which were unaffected by July's change.

In addition to commercial television services, Colac receives Government ABC Television which includes ABC TV, ABC HD, ABC2 now (ABC TV Plus) (Daily from 7.30pm to 5am), ABC Kids (Daily from 5am to 7.30pm), ABC Me (Daily from 6am to 11pm approx.) and ABC News as well as the SBS's owned channels of SBS One, SBS HD, SBS Viceland, National Indigenous Television, SBS Food,  SBS World Movies and SBS WorldWatch. Analog Television transmissions ceased on Thursday 5 May 2011 as part of the Federal Government's nationwide plan for Digital terrestrial television in Australia, which involves switching over all television broadcast services from analog systems to digital DVB-T systems.

FM radio services direct from Melbourne can be received in Colac but signal levels are low. Television services direct from Melbourne can be received in Colac but large antenna arrays must be used with mixed results.

Colac is serviced by Austar (now Foxtel) Subscription Television delivered by DTH satellite transmission, via Optus C1 Ku Band Satellite located at 156E.

Sport
Colac is home to a number of teams in the Colac & District Football and Netball League combining both Australian Rules football clubs and netball clubs from around the district.

The Colac Football Club, formerly of the CDFNL, compete in the Geelong Football League. Colac is also the hometown of Luke Hodge, from 2002 a player with Hawthorn Football Club (captain 2011 to 2016) and player with Brisbane Football Club in the Australian Football League since October 2017.

Colac has a horse racing club, the Colac Turf Club, which schedules around four race meetings a year including the Colac Cup meeting in February. It also has a picnic horse racing club, Colac St Patrick Picnic, which holds its one race meeting a year in March.

Golfers play at the Colac Golf Club on Colac–Lavers Hill Road, Elliminyt.

Colac has a swimming club which trains swimmers and has athletes competing at Region, State and national competitions.

Colac has a baseball club, the Colac Braves, a team which competes in the Geelong Baseball Association winter competition and the Pan-Pacific Masters Games on the Gold Coast. The Colac Braves also cater for players aged 5 to 15. The Braves have claimed recent premiership success in the Geelong Baseball Association with wins in 2008, 2009 and 2010.

The Colac Otway Rovers AFC is the region's only football (soccer) club established in 2010. The club entered the Football Federation Victoria—Geelong Region in 2011—fielding a team in the Men's Division 3 Competition. The Colac Otway Rovers conducts a Small Sided Football Program for juniors and an indoor soccer competition.

The Colac Basketball Association hosts summer and winter competitions at Colac's Bluewater stadium. The clubs are Saints, Hawks, Demons and Rebels. The association also has representative teams known as the Kookas. The juniors compete in tournaments, while the senior teams compete in Basketball Victoria Country's Country Basketball League.

Notable people

 Keith Doig MC - footballer, doctor, 1891–1949.
 Aaron Finch - cricketer, b. 1986.
 Athol Guy AO - musician, b. 1940.
 Alison Harcourt AO (née Doig) - b. 1929.
 Luke Hodge - footballer, b. 1984.
 R. M. Murray - mine manager, 1877–1945.
 Craig Spence - golfer, b. 1974.
 Stephen Walker - sculptor, 1927–2014.
 H. A. Willis - writer, b. 1948.
 Wil Traval - actor, b. 1980.

References

External links

Colac Herald Colac newspaper
Colac Community Website
Colac Otway Shire Council  information about local services, economic development and cultural

 
Towns in Victoria (Australia)